Hendrik Krawen (born 1963 in Lübeck, Germany) is a contemporary visual artist and installation artist.

Life and work 
From 1978 to 1981 Hendrik Krawen learned painting in the studio of the painter and graphic artist Rainer Erhard Teubert and 1980, architectural representation at a commercial artist in Lübeck. From 1982 to 1984 and from 1985 to 1990 he studied at the Kunstakademie Düsseldorf in the class of Alfonso Huppi. In 1990 he was one of the initiators of the project "EX WM" and between 1992 and 1994 of the project space WP8 (Artists Association) in Düsseldorf. He worked as a visiting professor 2007/2008 at the Academy of Fine Arts in Hamburg. Hendrik Krawen lives and works in Berlin.

Public collections 
 Bavarian State Painting Collections
 Kunsthalle zu Kiel
 Strasbourg Museum of Modern and Contemporary Art
 Falckenberg Collection, Hamburg
 Museum Kunstpalast Düsseldorf
 Leopold-Hoesch-Museum Dueren.

Exhibitions (selection) 
 2015  "Radical modern", Berlinische Galerie, Berlin
 2014   "Some of each" Martin Leyer-Pritzkow Ausstellungen, Düsseldorf 2014
 "Shades of Green", Galleria Lia Rumma, Naples, 2011
 "The youth of today", Schirn Kunsthalle, Frankfurt a. M., 2006
 "Metropolitanscape", Palazzo Cavour, Turin, 2006
 "spaceforspace", Kunsthalle Düsseldorf und Kunstverein, 2005
 "Central Station / La Collection Falckenberg ', La Maison Rouge, Paris, 2004
 "Deutschemalereizweitausendunddrei", Frankfurter Kunstverein, 2003
 "Motiv" Kerstin Engholm Galerie, Vienna, 2001
 "Salons des Musique", MAMCS, Strasbourg, 2001
 "Superca ...", SMBA, (Stedelijk Museum Bureau Amsterdam, 1999

Literature 
 Hendrik Krawen, "Shades of Green", ed. Lia Rumma Naples, 2010
 "Raumfürraum", ed. Kunsthalle Düsseldorf 2004
 "SEE history", ed. Kunsthalle zu Kiel 2003
'Traumfabrik Komunismus' Hatje Cantz, in the German National Library ,ed. by Boris Grojs, 2003  
 "Deutschemalereizweitausendunddrei" Lukas & Sternberg, FKV 2003
 Hendrik Krawen, "Lexicon Discothek Bon", Ed. Leopold-Hoesch-Museum, 1996

External links 
 
 Art works from Hendrik Krawen at Martin Leyer-Pritzkow
 Works by Hendrik Krawen on artsy.com
 Exhibition Galleria Lia Rumma Naples, 'Differenza e ripitizione' a cura di Gigiotto Del Vecchio, 2012
 Illustrations on discogs.com

Living people
1963 births
Kunstakademie Düsseldorf alumni
German contemporary artists
20th-century German painters
20th-century German male artists
German male painters